Although Mount Everest is the point with the highest elevation above sea level on the Earth, it is not the summit that is farthest from the Earth's centre. Because of the equatorial bulge, the summit of Mount Chimborazo in the Andes is the point on the Earth that is farthest from the centre, and is  farther from the Earth's centre than the summit of Everest. The second-farthest summit, Huascarán (also in the Andes), is only about 10 metres closer to the Earth's centre.

References

Lists of mountains